The Khyber Building is a registered Historical Property owned by the Halifax Regional Municipality  on Barrington Street in Halifax, Nova Scotia. Until 2014, it was operated as an artist-run centre, public art gallery and social space by Khyber Arts Society (The Khyber Centre for the Arts), which is now located at 1880 Hollis St.

History
1588 Barrington Street, was originally erected as The Church of England Institute in 1888. It was designed by architect Henry Busch in the Victorian style with Gothic Revival features. The building was commissioned by Bishop Hibbert Binney.  Other buildings designed by Busch in Halifax include the Halifax Academy and the Halifax Public Gardens Bandstand.

In 1994, the City of Halifax put out an RFP (Request for Proposal) for the building, but only received a few  offers. Its current tenants helped form the Arts Centre Project Society in order to secure the building as an arts centre. The Arts Centre Project Society was made up: the No Money Down Cultural Society (a group of artists active in building), various individual artists (including  Garry Neill Kennedy), and members from the Heritage Trust of Nova Scotia. The building was established as an art centre by City Council in 1994 and a month-to-month lease was signed.

In March 1995, the Khyber Arts Society was registered as a charitable organization. Recent NSCAD grad Kelly Mark ran the bar on the first floor for several years. Phil Grauer who went on to form Canada Gallery NYC served as director.  Founding tenants included Chesnut Tree Theatre (Jennifer Smith) and Ultramagnetic recording studio run by Charles Austin (Superfriendz) and Kevin Lewis (Parenthesis gallery). Artists that have shown at the Khyber since then include:  Luis Jacob, Emily Vey Duke & Cooper Battersby, Gillian Wearing, Kelly Mark, David Askevold, Shary Boyle, Gerald Ferguson, Alison Mitchel, Thierry Delva and the Critical Art Ensemble.  The Rankin Family filmed the music video for their song "You Feel The Same Way Too" at the Khyber in the mid 1990s.

In 1997, the Khyber Arts Society signed a five-year renewable lease with the City to occupy the Khyber Building.

In 1998, the Khyber Club opened as a gallery space for contemporary art, a meeting place for the visual arts community and as a venue for Halifax's emerging music scene including acts by Canadian recording artists Joel Plaskett, Sloan, Eric's Trip, Elevator to Hell, Al Tuck, Soaking Up Jagged, Rick of the Skins, Julie Doiron, Jenn Grant, Old Man Luedecke, Tanya Davis, Buck 65, Skratch Bastid, Classified and Ghettosocks.

In April 2014, Halifax Regional Municipality closed the building due to evidence of hazardous materials. The building's most recent occupancy consisted of the Khyber Arts Society, as well as the Heritage Trust of Nova Scotia.

See also

Down at the Khyber; by Joel Plaskett

References

External links
The Khyber Centre for the Arts
1588 Building Preservation Society
The Turret

Churches completed in 1888
Art museums and galleries in Nova Scotia
Museums in Halifax, Nova Scotia
Music venues in Halifax, Nova Scotia
Contemporary art galleries in Canada
Former Anglican churches
Arts centres in Canada